De Otra Manera is the third studio album by Puerto Rican reggaeton duo Wisin & Yandel, released on August 14, 2002, by then independent label Lideres Entertainment Group.

Track listing

Charts

References

2002 albums
Wisin & Yandel albums
Albums produced by Luny Tunes